Stereos is the eponymous debut album by Canadian pop rock band Stereos, released on October 20, 2009. The deluxe version features two additional tracks "Bye Bye Baby" and "All U Pretty Girls". The album debuted at #3 on the Canadian Albums Chart, and was certified gold by the CRIA with over 40,000 copies sold. It was nominated for Best Pop Album at the 2010 Juno Awards, but lost to Michael Bublé's Crazy Love.

Track listing
 "Addicted" – 2:49
 "Get with You" (featuring Far East Movement) – 3:00
 "Summer Girl" – 2:45
 "Butterflies" – 2:50
 "Turn It Up" – 2:54
 "Hey Cupid" – 3:20
 "Jet Black Cadillac" – 2:57
 "She Only Likes Me When She's Drunk" – 3:03
 "Throw Ya Hands Up" (featuring Jhevon Paris) – 2:42
 "Give You Up" – 3:46

Deluxe version
<li>"Bye Bye Baby" – 3:02
<li>"All U Pretty Girls" – 3:05

Deluxe version downloadable tracks
 "Paid Like This and What Not"
 "I Like It"
 "Throw Ya Hands Up" (Real Talk Remix)
 "LA Dreamin"
 "Summer Girl" (Coleco Remix)
 "Jet Black Cadillac" (Remix feat. Devylle)
 "Out of Love Song"
 "Back Home"
 "No Lie"
 "Give Euro Up" (Give U Up Remix)
 "Get It On"
 "Like U Do"

Bonus tracks
 "Summer Girl" (acoustic) – 2:43

Charts

Certifications

References

2009 debut albums
Stereos albums
Universal Music Canada albums